Dimitrije Đorđević may refer to:

Dimitrije Đorđević (historian)
Dimitrije Đorđević, one of the founders of the Niš Committee